JackBoys (stylized in all caps) is a collaborative compilation album by American record label Cactus Jack Records, under the name JackBoys, and American rapper Travis Scott, its leader. It was released through the label alongside Epic Records on December 27, 2019. The album features guest appearances from Rosalía, Lil Baby, Sheck Wes, Don Toliver, Quavo, Offset, Young Thug, and Pop Smoke. JackBoys is a hip hop collective of rappers signed to Scott's Cactus Jack imprint, including Scott himself, Wes, Toliver, Luxury Tax 50, and Scott's DJ Chase B. Upon debut, JackBoys opened atop the US Billboard 200 on January 11, 2020, becoming the first number one album of the 2020s. This is Scott's third album to debut atop the chart since his third studio album, Astroworld (2018).

Background and release
In March 2017, Scott announced he would be launching his own imprint, under the name of Cactus Jack Records. During an interview, Scott said, "I'm not doing it to have financial control over my music. I want first and foremost to help other artists, launch new names, to provide opportunities. I want to do for them what happened to me, but better." In September 2017, fellow American rapper Smokepurpp signed to the label, but he left sometime later in 2019. In February 2018, the label signed Sheck Wes in a joint deal with Interscope Records and GOOD Music.
In August, Don Toliver was signed to the label. After the release of Scott's third studio album, Astroworld (2018), artists Wes and Toliver began to rise to popularity after they appeared on the album. Wes's June 2017 single, "Mo Bamba", went viral in 2018 and Toliver's May 2019 single, "No Idea", went viral on the app TikTok in the same year. Wes and Toliver both helped Scott on Astroworld, with Wes being featured alongside fellow American rapper Juice Wrld on "No Bystanders" and Toliver being featured on "Can't Say". On November 29, 2019, Scott released JackBoys merchandise on his website, including a digital album preorder for $10. On December 24, Scott revealed on Twitter that the album would be released within the week. On December 26, a day before the album was released, the cover art and release date were revealed and the song titles were leaked on Shazam.

Singles
The lead single of the album, "Had Enough", performed by American rapper and singer Don Toliver that features American rappers Quavo and Offset from the hip hop trio Migos, was released along with the album on December 27, 2019. The remix of Scott's 2019 single, "Highest in the Room", features Spanish singer Rosalía and American rapper Lil Baby was sent to Italian contemporary hit radio as the second single on January 7, 2020. The third and final single, "Out West", performed by JackBoys and Scott that features American rapper Young Thug, was sent to rhythmic contemporary radio on February 18, 2020.

Commercial performance
JackBoys debuted at number one on the US Billboard 200 with 154,000 album-equivalent units, of which 79,000 were pure album sales. In its second week, the album dropped to number four on the chart, earning 47,000 album-equivalent units. In its third week, the album dropped to number seven on the chart, earning 38,000 more units that week. All the songs on the album debuted on the Billboard Hot 100 with the exception of the titular track.

Track listing

Notes
  signifies a co-producer
  signifies a miscellaneous producer
  signifies an uncredited additional producer
 All tracks are stylized in all caps.
 "JackBoys" was titled as "Intro" when the album released and changed a day later
 "Gang Gang" features uncredited vocals by Don Toliver, Travis Scott and Luxury Tax.

Sample credits
 "Gang Gang" contains interpolations of "Win", written by Johnny McKinzie, Kendrick Duckworth, Matthew Samuels, Anderson Hernandez, Elmer Bernstein, and Corey Thompson, and performed by Jay Rock.
 "Had Enough" contains elements of "Summer", written by Beyoncé Knowles, Shawn Carter, Marcello Valenzano, Andre Christopher Lyon, Leon Michels, Homer Steinweiss, Thomas Brenneck, Mike Herard, and James Fauntleroy II, and performed by The Carters.
 "Gatti" contains a sample of "Slunečnice Pro Vincenta Van Gogha", written by Petr Klapka and performed by Mahagon.

Personnel
 David Rodriguez – recording 
 Travis Scott – recording 
 Rob Bisel – recording 
 Flo – recording 
 Derek Anderson – recording 
 Nate Alford – recording 
 Colton Eatmon – engineering 
 Trevor Coulter – engineering 
 Jon Sher – engineering assistant 
 Josh Harris – engineering assistant 
 Sean Solymar – engineering assistant 
 Jimmy Cash – engineering assistant , recording 
 Shawn Morenberg – engineering assistant 
 Harmony Korine – artwork 
 Mike Dean – mixing , mastering

Charts

Weekly charts

Year-end charts

Certifications

References

2019 compilation albums
Cactus Jack Records albums
Epic Records albums
Travis Scott albums
Hip hop compilation albums